Tseveensürengiin Ganbayar (born 2 June 1991) is a Mongolian international footballer. He has appeared 4 times for the Mongolia national football team.

References

1991 births
Mongolian footballers
Living people
Association football goalkeepers
Mongolia international footballers